Gira 2002 is a live concert DVD documenting Spanish rock band Extremoduro’s Gira 2002 (2002 Tour) released on 3 May 2004. The DVD includes footage from three concerts performed in 2002 in Leganés, Lesaka and Bilbao.

In 2020, the video was published by Warner Music as a streaming release featuring two additional unreleased tracks.

Track listing 
 "A fuego"
 "Buscando una luna"
 "El duende del parque"
 "Tu corazón"
 "Hoy te la meto"
 "Golfa"
 "Quemando tus recuerdos"
 "La vereda de la puerta de atrás"
 "So payaso"
 "Deltoya"
 "La vieja"
 "Autorretrato"
 "Pedrá" (unreleased)
 "Sucede" (unreleased)
 "Pepe Botika"
 "J.D. La central nuclear"
 "Menamoro"
 "Amor castúo"
 "Salir"
 "Standby"
 "Ama, ama, ama y ensancha el alma"

Music videos 
"So payaso"
"Esclarecido"
"A fuego"
"Puta"
"Standby"

Chart positions

DVD charts

Certifications

Personnel 
Extremoduro
Roberto Iniesta - vocals, guitar
Iñaki "Uoho" Antón, guitar
Miguel Colino - bass guitar
Jose Ignacio Cantera - drums
Additional personnel
 Félix Landa - Guitar
 Aiert Erkoreka - Keyboards

References

Extremoduro albums
2004 video albums
Spanish-language video albums